Scymnus nuttingi, is a species of beetle found in the family Coccinellidae discovered by J. Gordon Edwards in 1976. It is found in North America.

For its visual system it has ocelli for eyes.

References 

Coccinellidae
Beetles described in 1976